Gibbard is a surname. Notable people with the surname include:

Allan Gibbard (born 1942), Professor of Philosophy, University of Michigan
Ben Gibbard (born 1976), American musician
Les Gibbard (1945–2010), political cartoonist, journalist, illustrator
Phil Gibbard (born 1949), Professor of Quaternary Palaeoenvironments, University of Cambridge

See also
Gibbard–Satterthwaite theorem